Last Days of the Century is the eleventh studio album by Al Stewart, released in August 1988. It was re-released in 2007 with bonus tracks.

Track listing
Original LP Release

Side 1
"Last Days of the Century" (Al Stewart, Peter White) (6:17)
"Real and Unreal" (Stewart) (3:32)
"King of Portugal" (Stewart, White) (4:22)
"Red Toupée" (Stewart, White) (3:34)
"Where Are They Now" (Stewart, White) (5:55)

Side 2
"Bad Reputation" (Stewart, White) (4:54)
"Josephine Baker" (Stewart, White) (4:11)
"License to Steal" (Stewart) (3:50)
"Fields of France" (Stewart) (2:52)
"Antarctica" (Stewart, White) (4:04)
"Ghostly Horses of the Plain" (Stewart, Steve Recker) (2:26)

Original CD Release Bonus Track
"Helen and Cassandra" (Stewart) (4:44)

2007 CD Re-Release Bonus Tracks
"Ghostly Horses of the Plain" (vocal) (Stewart, Recker) (3:29)
"Ten Cents" (Stewart, Tori Amos) (4:05)
"Dreaming" (Stewart, Amos) (4:16)

Notes
"Ghostly Horses of the Plain" is an instrumental: Al Stewart has also recorded a version of the song with lyrics, available on the 1996 release "Seemed Like A Good Idea At The Time" and as a bonus track on the 2007 "Last Days of the Century" CD re-release.
Tori Amos sings background vocals on two tracks, "Last Days of the Century" and "Red Toupée".
Cover photography by AWest
Recorded at Capitol Studio B, Hollywood, CA
Additional recording at Ground Control, Santa Monica, CA

Personnel
 Al Stewart - vocals (liner notes do not list what instruments he plays on the album)
 Peter White - accordion, acoustic guitar, electric guitar, keyboards
 Tim Renwick - electric guitar
 Steve Farris - electric guitar
 Steve Recker - acoustic guitar, electric guitar
 Tim Landers - bass
 Vinnie Colaiuta - drums
 Steve Chapman - drums on "Helen and Cassandra", percussion
 Dave Camp - flute, saxophones
 Phil Kenzie - saxophones
 Lee R. Thornburg - trumpet
 Robin Lamble - background vocals
 Tori Amos - background vocals on "Last Days of the Century" and "Red Toupée"
 Carroll Sue Hill - background vocals

Sources 
 Al Stewart discography at www.alstewart.com.
 Enigma Records CD liner notes

Al Stewart albums
1988 albums
Enigma Records albums
Albums recorded at Capitol Studios